Monmouthshire is a county in the south-east of Wales. The name derives from the historic county of the same name; the modern county covers the eastern three-fifths of the historic county. The largest town is Abergavenny, with other towns and large villages being: Caldicot, Chepstow, Monmouth, Magor and Usk. It borders Torfaen, Newport and Blaenau Gwent to the west; Herefordshire and Gloucestershire to the east; and Powys to the north.

Historic county

The historic county of Monmouthshire was formed from the Welsh Marches by the Laws in Wales Act 1535 bordering Gloucestershire to the east, Herefordshire to the northeast, Brecknockshire to the north, and Glamorgan to the west. The Laws in Wales Act 1542 enumerated the counties of Wales and omitted Monmouthshire, implying that the county was no longer to be treated as part of Wales. However, for all purposes Wales had become part of the Kingdom of England, and the difference had little practical effect.

For several centuries, acts of the Parliament of England (in which Wales was represented) often referred to "Wales and Monmouthshire", such as the controversial Welsh Church Act 1914. However, the Local Government Act 1972, which came into effect in April 1974, confirmed the county as part of Wales, with the administrative county of Monmouthshire and its associated lieutenancy being abolished. Most of its area was transferred to a new local government and ceremonial county called Gwent, with the same eastern and southern boundaries as the historic county, the River Wye and the Severn Estuary. The western two-fifths are now administered by other principal areas: Blaenau Gwent, Torfaen, Caerphilly, and Newport.

Principal area

The current unitary authority of Monmouthshire was created on 1 April 1996 as a successor to the district of Monmouth along with the Llanelly community from Blaenau Gwent, both of which were districts of Gwent.
The use of the name "Monmouthshire" rather than "Monmouth" for the area was controversial, being supported by the member of parliament (MP) for Monmouth, Roger Evans, but being opposed by Paul Murphy, MP for Torfaen (inside the historic county of Monmouthshire but being reconstituted as a separate unitary authority). By area it covers some 60% of the historic county, but only 20% of the population.
A new council headquarters building at the site of Coleg Gwent, Usk was proposed and developed. The new county hall in Usk was opened in 2013.

Under the Local Government (Wales) Act 1994, Monmouthshire is styled as a county.

In comparison to the pre-1974 areas, it covers:
 the former boroughs of Abergavenny and Monmouth
 the former urban districts of Chepstow and Usk
 the former rural districts of Abergavenny, Chepstow and Monmouth
 the former rural district of Pontypool, except the community of Llanfrechfa Lower
 the parish of Llanelly from the former Crickhowell Rural District in Brecknockshire

Places of interest

 Chepstow Castle
 Raglan Castle
 Monmouth
 Trellech
 Abergavenny Castle
 Wye Valley
 Black Mountains
 Brecon Beacons National Park
 White Castle
 Skenfrith Castle
 Grosmont Castle
 Three Castles Walk
 Offa's Dyke
 Llanthony Priory
 Tintern Abbey
 Usk
 Usk Valley Walk
 Abergavenny
 Monmouthshire and Brecon Canal
 Marches Way
 Monnow Valley Walk
 Caldicot Castle
 The Kymin
 The Sugar Loaf

Scenic Railway Line:

 Gloucester–Newport line

Geography
Much of Monmouthshire is hilly, particularly the western area adjoining the industrial South Wales Valleys and the Black Mountains to the north. Two major river valleys dominate the lowlands - the scenic gorge of the Wye Valley along the border with Gloucestershire adjoining the Forest of Dean, and the valley of the River Usk between Abergavenny and Newport. Both rivers flow south to the Severn Estuary. The River Monnow is a tributary of the River Wye and forms part of the border with Herefordshire and England, passing through the town of Monmouth. The Black Mountains are part of the Brecon Beacons National Park, whilst the Wye Valley is a designated Area of Outstanding Natural Beauty which straddles the England–Wales border.

Although its height is only , its isolation and distinctive peak shape makes it a prominent landmark for many miles around.

Education

References

External links
 Monmouthshire County Council
 
 The Original Monmouthshire website Monmouthshire.co.uk
 Genuki National Gazetteer of 1868

 
Counties of Wales
Principal areas of Wales